Mecca Mall is a shopping mall in Amman, Jordan. Its name is derived from its location on Mecca Street.

See also
City Mall
Abdali Mall

References

External links
Kurdi Group Official Website
About Mecca Mall – AmmanYaho

Tourism in Jordan
Shopping malls in Jordan